Casearia tinifolia was a species of flowering plant in the family Salicaceae. It was endemic to Mauritius.

References

tinifolia
Endemic flora of Mauritius
Extinct plants
Extinct biota of Africa
Taxonomy articles created by Polbot